Ural District may refer to:
 Ural Federal District, a major administrative region of Russia 2001–
 Ural Military District, a military district of the USSR and Russia 1918–2001
 , a district of Kazakh ASSR 1928–1930, centred on the city of Oral, Kazakhstan

See also 
 Ural Oblast (disambiguation)
 Ural (region)